Walter Wilkins may refer to:

 Walter Wilkins (1741–1828), Member of Parliament for Radnorshire 1796–1828
 Walter Wilkins (d. 1840), Member of Parliament for Radnorshire 1835–40
 Sir Walter Wilkin (1842-1922), Lord Mayor of London 1895–96